Vladimir "Vlada" Avramov (born 5 April 1979) is a Serbian former professional footballer who played as a goalkeeper. He works as David Suazo's goalkeeping coach for Brescia.

Club career 
Avramov started his career at First League of FR Yugoslavia with FK Vojvodina. In 2001, he moved to Vicenza, and after played five seasons in Serie B (one of them on loan at Pescara), he joined Fiorentina in August 2006, being immediately loaned to Treviso.

Avramov returned to Fiorentina in June 2007, and after spending the vast majority of the campaign as a backup to Sébastien Frey, made his Serie A debut on 17 February 2008, replacing the latter in the 55th minute of a 2–1 home win against Catania. He would spend his spell as second-choice, however.

On 19 July 2011 Avramov signed for Cagliari. Initially behind Michael Agazzi, he overtook the latter during the 2013–14 season, appearing in 23 matches.

On 19 July 2014 Avramov joined Torino, and was subsequently loaned to Atalanta on 1 September. His contract with Torino expired on 1 July 2015 leaving him as a free agent.

International career 
He earned his first call-up to national team against Azerbaijan, 2 September 2006, but he made his debut on 21 October 2007 versus Poland, due to injury of long term regular Vladimir Stojković.

Coaching career 
On 11 July 2018, he was officially unveiled as new goalkeeping coach of Serie B club Brescia under head coach David Suazo. From augustus 2020 until January 2021 he was goalkeeping coach at the Turkish club Caykur Rizespor.

Personal life 
He married Serbian singer Slavica Ćukteraš in 2015 and became father of a daughter in 2016.

International statistics

References

External links 

Statistics on aic.football.it  

1979 births
Living people
Footballers from Novi Sad
Serbian footballers
Association football goalkeepers
FK Vojvodina players
Serie A players
Serie B players
J1 League players
Treviso F.B.C. 1993 players
Delfino Pescara 1936 players
L.R. Vicenza players
ACF Fiorentina players
Cagliari Calcio players
Torino F.C. players
Atalanta B.C. players
FC Tokyo players
Serbia international footballers
Serbian expatriate footballers
Expatriate footballers in Italy
Expatriate footballers in Japan